Rakel Helmsdal (born 25 September 1966) is a Faroese writer. Her mother is the Faroese poet Guðrið Helmsdal and her father the wood artist Ole Jakob Nielsen. Rakel was born in Tårnby, Amager, Denmark, but has lived in Tórshavn in the Faroe Islands for most of her life.  She lived for five years in France, where she wrote four of her books. She teaches creative writing.

Together with Áslaug Jónsdóttir from Iceland and Kalle Güettler from Sweden, she has written a series of books about the little and the big monster.

Helmsdal was president of the Faroese writer's association Rithøvundafelag Føroya from 2009 to 2011.

Helmsdal has created her own marionette theatre, which she calls Karavella Marionett-Theatre.

Bibliography

Books 

 1995 – Tey kalla meg bara Hugo (2. edition: 2003)
 1996 – Søgur úr Port Janua (short stories)
 1997 – Hvørjum flenna likkurnar at, Hugo?
 1998 – Drekar og annað valafólk, illustrated by Edward Fuglø
 2003 – Kom yvirum, Hugo!
 2004 – Nei! segði lítla skrímsl, written together with Icelandic Áslaug Jónsdóttir and Swedish Kalle Güettler
 2006 – Stór skrímsl gráta ikki, written together with Icelandic Áslaug Jónsdóttir and Swedish Kalle Güettler
 2007 – Gott hugflog Hugo
 2007 – Myrkaskrímsl, written together with Icelandic Áslaug Jónsdóttir and Swedish Kalle Güettler
 2008 – Skrímslasótt, written together with Icelandic Áslaug Jónsdóttir and Swedish Kalle Güettler
 2008 – Várferðin til Brúnna, From Mosakulla 1, illustrated by Edward Fuglø
 2009 – Veturin hjá Undu. From Mosakullan 2, illustrated by Edward Fuglø
 2010 – Skrímslavitjan, written together with Icelandic Áslaug Jónsdóttir and Swedish Kalle Güettler
 2011 – Skrímslahæddir, written together with Icelandic Áslaug Jónsdóttir and Swedish Kalle Güettler
 2011 – Veiða vind, musical work, book and CD. Rakel Helmsdal wrote the text, Kári Bech composed the music tónleikin and Janus á Húsagarði made the drawings. The musical work was performed in Norðurlandahúsið (The Nordic House in Tórshavn) for 3500 children who came from villages from all around the islands.
 2011 – Revurin við silkiturriklæðinum
 2013 – Klandursskrímsl, written together with Áslaug Jónsdóttir and Kalle Güettler
 2014 – Hon, sum róði eftir ælaboganum, 
 2014 – Skrímslakiskan, written together with Áslaug Jónsdóttir and Kalle Güettler
 2017 – Neyðars skrímsl, written together with Áslaug Jónsdóttir and Kalle Güettler
 2018 – Miljuløtur
 2019 – Loftar tú mær?

Short stories and other short texts 

 1989 – Firvaldaseljarin (published in the Faroese literature magazine Brá)
 1989 – Dýpið (Published in Brá, later translated into Norwegian in Fysta ferda bort, Samlaget, 1993)
 1992 – Ferðandi í tíð og rúmd (ferðahugleiðing (Varðin, 52))
 1993 – Delirium symphonica (poem in Brá)
 1995 – Glámlýsi og mánalátur (published in Birting 1995, and in the book Søgur úr Port Janua, Bókadeild Føroya Lærarafelags, 1996)
 1995 – Argantael (published in Ein varligur dráttur í tara, MFS, 1995)
 1993 – Køksgluggin (published in Barnablaðið in November and December 1993, illustrated by Edward Fuglø, also published in Drekar og annað valafólk, Bókadeild Føroya Lærarafelags, 1998)
 1995 – Apríl (Published in Søgur úr Port Janua, Bókadeild Føroya Lærarafelags, 1995, also published in Heiðin hind, Skúlabókagrunnurin, 1999)
 1996 – Skerdu vit veingir tínar, Ikaros? (Published in Søgur úr Port Janua / Stories from Port Janua) 
 2001 – Angi av ribes (published in the short story anthology Mjørki í heilum, Bókadeild Føroya Lærarafelags, 2001)
 2002 – Huldumjørkin (Vit lesa. Kom við (Skúlabókagrunnurin) 2002)
 2005 – Alioth ("Mín jólabók 2005", Bókadeild Føroya Lærarafelags)
 2006 – Fimm mans til eina kvartett (Svartideyði og aðrar spøkilsissøgur / The black death and other ghost stories (Bókadeild Føroya Lærarafelags) 2006)
 2007 – Kvirra nátt ("Mín jólabók 2007", Bókadeild Føroya Lærarafelags)
 2008 – Ov nógv av tí góða – og eitt sindur afturat (published in "Mín jólabók 2008", Bókadeild Føroya Lærarafelags)
 2009 – Ongin inni (published in "Mín jólabók 2009", Bókadeild Føroya Lærarafelags) 
 2010 – Spitølsk short story for children, published in Elskar – elskar ikki, which is a collection short stories by Nordic authors
 2013 –  Ljósareyðir UFO'ar (published in "Mín jólabók 2013", Bókadeild Føroya Lærarafelags) 
 2014 – Suð av ymsum ættum (published in "Mín jólabók 2014", Bókadeild Føroya Lærarafelags) 
 2015 – Akkurát sum Klikk-Karl (published in "Mín jólabók 2015", Bókadeild Føroya Lærarafelags) 
 2016 – Út í vindin (published in "Mín jólabók 2016", Bókadeild Føroya Lærarafelags) 
 2017 – Tú ert púra svøk! (published in "Mín jólabók 2017", Bókadeild Føroya Lærarafelags)
 2018 – Loftar tú mær? (published in "Mín jólabók 2018", Bókadeild Føroya Lærarafelags)
 2019 – Omman mín er ein eingil (published in "Mín jólabók 2019", Bókadeild Føroya Lærarafelags)

Plays 
1988 – Nær kemur kavin? 
1989 – Ævinliga árið 
1999 – Brúsajøkul 
1996 – Kvarnareygað Purpurreyða 
1997 – 5 violettir flugusoppar
1998 – Tá mánin setur og sólin rísur 
1999 – Vitavørðurin 
2000 – Sildrekin 
2002 – Gomul skuld
2011 – Revurin við silkiturriklæðinum
2012 – Skrímslini
2013 – Veiða vind
2016 – Dansa so væl og leingi
2017 – Skrímslalív

Recognition 

 1996 – Barnabókaheiðursløn Tórshavnar Býráðs (Faroese award) for her children's book Tey kalla meg bara Hugo.
 2004 – Dimmalim (Icelandic award) for Nei! segði lítla skrímsl, which was written together with Icelandic Áslaug Jónsdóttir and Swedish Kalle Güettler
 2007 – Barnabókaverðlaun Menntaráðs Reykjavíkur (Icelandic award) for Stór skrímsl gráta ikki, which was written together with Icelandic Áslaug Jónsdóttir and Swedish Kalle Güettler
 2008 – Won an award in a short story competition, the stories should be for the Faroese youth
 2009 – Várferðin til Brúnna – nominated for the West Nordic Council's Children and Youth Literature Prize.
 2011 – Skrímslahæddir nominated for the Fjörðuverðlaun (Icelandic award).
 2013 – Veiða vind nominated for the Nordic Children's Book Prize (called Nordisk Skolebibliotekarforenings Børnebogspris or Nordisk Børnebogspris in Danish and Norwegian).
 2013 – Children's Cultural Prize of Tórshavn City Council (Faroese cultural award for children's literature and other cultural achievements), she won the award for Veiða vind and for the books about the Skrímsl (the Monsters) and the plays made of these books
 2013 – Nominated for the Nordic Council Children and Young People's Literature Prize together with Áslaug Jónsdóttir and Kalle Güettler for the book Klandursskrímsl
 2016 – Nominated for the West Nordic Council's Children and Youth Literature Prize for her book Hon, sum róði eftir ælaboganum.
 2016 – Received the West Nordic Council's Children and Youth Literature Prize for her book Hon, sum róði eftir ælaboganum.
 2017 – Nominated for the Nordic Council Children and Young People's Literature Prize for the book Hon, sum róði eftir ælaboganum''
 2020 – Barnabókaheiðursløn Tórshavnar Býráðs

References

External links 

 BFL.fo 
 Almenna heimasíðan hjá Rakel Helmsdal

1966 births
Living people
Faroese writers
Faroese women writers
Faroese children's writers
Faroese fantasy writers
Faroese short story writers
Faroese Children's Literature Prize recipients
Danish women short story writers
Danish women children's writers
Faroese women children's writers
Women science fiction and fantasy writers
People from Tårnby Municipality